Farooqnagar is a census town in Ranga Reddy district  of the Indian state of Telangana.

Demographics 
 census of India, it had population of 45,675.

References 

Cities and towns in Ranga Reddy district